The Philippine Senate Committee on Higher, Technical and Vocational Education is a standing committee of the Senate of the Philippines.

This committee, along with the Committee on Basic Education, Arts and Culture, was formed after the Committee on Education, Arts and Culture was split into two on July 31, 2019, pursuant to Senate Resolution No. 6 of the 18th Congress.

Jurisdiction 
According to the Rules of the Senate, the committee handles all matters relating to:

 Post-secondary and tertiary education
 Technical education
 Distance education
 Vocational education
 Commission on Higher Education
 Technical Education and Skills Development Authority
 Students and teachers’ welfare
 Centers of excellence
 Scholarships, grants, subsidies and incentives to deserving students

Members, 18th Congress 
Based on the Rules of the Senate, the Senate Committee on Higher, Technical and Vocational Education has 15 members.

The President Pro Tempore, the Majority Floor Leader, and the Minority Floor Leader are ex officio members.

Here are the members of the committee in the 18th Congress as of September 24, 2020:

Committee secretary: Joey M. Tunac

See also 

 List of Philippine Senate committees

References 

Higher
Higher education in the Philippines